La Pinareja is a  mountain in Spain.

Geography 
The mountain is located in El Espinar municipality (Segovia Province), in the south-eastern part of the autonomous community of Castile and León. It's the highest peak of the mountain range called La Mujer Muerta. From its north face a large part of the Segovia's plain can be seen, while its eastern slopes look towards Valsaín and Río Moros valleys.

Access to the summit 
The summit can be accessed from Cercedilla through the mountain pass of Puerto de La Fuenfría (1796 m), from Navas de Riofrío (1267 m) or from the village of Revenga (1132 m). During summer these ways can be easily followed, but in winter abundant snow and ice can require crampons and ice axe.

See also
Sistema Central

References

External links
  Route to La Pinareja and others peaks of the area

Sierra de Guadarrama
Mountains of Castile and León
Geography of the Province of Segovia
Two-thousanders of Spain